The 1952 United States Senate election in California was held on November 4, 1952. 

By cross-filing and winning the Democratic nomination, incumbent Republican Senator William F. Knowland was able to cruise to a general election victory with only nominal opposition.

Until 1988, this was the last time a nominee from either party won re-election to this seat.

Republican primary

Candidates
Robert D. Adams
William F. Knowland, incumbent Senator since 1945

Results

Democratic primary

Candidates
Clinton D. McKinnon, U.S. Representative from San Diego
Arthur W. Watwood

Results

General election

Results

See also 
 1952 United States Senate elections

References 

1952
California
United States Senate